"2 in the Morning" is the third single by the American pop group Girlicious's second album Rebuilt. It was produced by Kuya Productions and Jedi. It was digitally released to the Canadian iTunes Store on August 31, 2010, in Canada, and to the American iTunes Store on August 31, 2010. The song samples ATC's "Around the World (La La La La La)".

Chart performance
The song debuted on the Canadian Airplay chart at number 48 on the week of September 1, 2010. The single eventually reached its peak on its seventh week on the chart, at number 19.
On the week of September 10, 2010, the song debuted on the Canadian Hot 100 at number 57. On the week of November 13, 2010, the song reached its peak at number 35 making it so far the most successful single from this era, and their highest-peaking single since "Stupid Shit". The single remained on the Canadian Hot 100 chart for a total of 14 weeks.

Remixes
On January 11, 2011, Girlicious released to Canadian iTunes as digital download the first official remix of "2 in the Morning" which was dubbed as "Original Harper & Brother Remix".

Charts

Radio date and release history

References

2010 singles
American dance-pop songs
Girlicious songs
2010 songs
Universal Music Canada singles